The Inheritance (Danish: Arven) is a 2003 Danish film directed by Per Fly. It is released as Inheritance in the United Kingdom.

The screenplay was written by Kim Leona, Per Fly and Mogens Rukov produced by Ib Tardini, and starred Ulrich Thomsen and Lisa Werlinder.

Plot 
Christoffer (Ulrich Thomsen) is called back from his life as a restaurant manager in Sweden when his father commits suicide. His mother, Annelise (Ghita Nørby) puts pressure on him to take over management of the family business, a steelworks factory.

Although his heart is not in it, he feels obligated to take up the task. The decision is met with frustration and anger from his wife Maria (Lisa Werlinder), who eventually accepts his decision and moves back to Denmark along with him.

The management task is slowly taking over Christoffer's time and life, and as a consequence, he ignores the needs of himself and his wife. As the managerial dilemmas include some of his personal relations, he is forced to give up his personal morals in order to meet the company needs.

Slowly, but surely, his altered life style pushes him away from Maria, who moves back to pursue her career as an actress in Sweden, which pushes him further towards a nervous breakdown.

The movie ends with the acceptance of his fate, indicating that he is following closely in the footsteps of his father, which led to the suicide in the beginning.

Cast 
 Ulrich Thomsen as Christoffer
 Lisa Werlinder as Maria
 Ghita Nørby as  Annelise
 Karina Skands as Benedikte
 Lars Brygmann as Ulrik
 Peter Steen  as Niels
 Diana Axelsen as Annika
 Jesper Christensen as Holger Andersen
 Ulf Pilgaard as Aksel
 Dick Kaysø as Jens Mønsted
 Sarah Juel Werner as Marie-Louise

Critical reception 
Upon release, the film received positive reviews. On Rotten Tomatoes it has an approval rating of 75% based on reviews from 36 critics. On Metacritic, it has a score of 68% based on 20 reviews.

References

External links 
 

2003 films
2003 drama films
2000s Danish-language films
Best Danish Film Robert Award winners
Danish drama films
Films directed by Per Fly